Murderabilia, also known as murderbilia, is a term identifying collectibles related to murders, homicides, the perpetrators or other violent crimes. The term was coined by Andy Kahan, director of the Houston Police Department's Crime Victims Office.

Collectibles

Buyers typically seek collectibles that are either artifacts used or owned by murderers or items (often artwork) created by them. According to crime writer Leigh Lundin, buyers may be interested in the macabre, but many believe such artifacts offer power and control. 

Virtually anything once owned or created  by mass murderers or serial killers can be marketed, such as vehicles, artwork and weapons used in crimes. Clothing is also in high demand, particularly clothes worn during crimes themselves.

Sale and display of murderabilia items 

In 2007, American school shooter Wayne Lo caused controversy after it was found that he was selling his artwork on a website.

In June 2011, the United States Government auctioned off personal items which belonged to Ted Kaczynski which were found in his Montana cabin upon his capture in 1996. The auction took place entirely online. The proceeds went to victims and victims' families of Kaczynski's crimes.

Attempts to restrict sale of murderabilia items
In 2005, serial killer Alfred Gaynor's artwork was sold online in Massachusetts. State lawmakers proposed to block the activity, setting off a debate on free speech rights of prisoners. 

Andy Kahan, director of the Houston-based Mayor's Crime Victims Office, has lobbied strongly against the sale of murderabilia material. In May 2001, eBay banned the sale of murderabilia items. The sale of such items was banned in five states: Texas, California, New Jersey, Michigan and Utah. In 2010, Senators John Cornyn of Texas and Amy Klobuchar of Minnesota teamed up to introduce a bill in Congress that would have outlawed the sale of murderabilia on the federal level. The bill was called the "Stop the Sale of Murderabilia to Protect the Dignity of Crime Victims Act of 2010," and came after several individual fights over the issue. The bill died in committee.

See also
 Lynching postcards
 Son of Sam law
 Nazi memorabilia

References 

Collecting
Murder
Memorabilia